Liza Estefany van der Most (born 8 October 1993) is a Dutch footballer who plays as defender for AFC Ajax in the Eredivisie and the Netherlands women's national football team.

Club career
As youth player, she played at VV Papendrecht before she joined the girl's academic of SteDoCo at the age of 11. In September 2008 she earned a spot in the KNVB Talent team. In July 2012 she was transferred to Ajax, where she made her professional debut on 24 August 2012 in the match against SC Heerenveen.

International career
She made her international debut on 20 August 2014 against Brazil.

She was part of the Dutch team which won the UEFA Women's Euro 2017.

Personal life
Van der Most was born in Colombia. She was adopted by a family in Papendrecht when she was seven months old.

Honours

Club
Ajax
 Eredivisie (1): 2016–17
 KNVB Women's Cup (2): 2013–14, 2016–17

International
Netherlands
 UEFA European Women's Championship (1): 2017
Algarve Cup: 2018

References

External links

Profile at onsoranje.nl 

1993 births
Living people
Dutch women's footballers
Netherlands women's international footballers
Eredivisie (women) players
AFC Ajax (women) players
Women's association football defenders
UEFA Women's Championship-winning players
Knights of the Order of Orange-Nassau
2019 FIFA Women's World Cup players
Dutch adoptees
Dutch people of Colombian descent
People from Papendrecht
Footballers from Bogotá
Colombian emigrants to the Netherlands
Naturalised citizens of the Netherlands
Footballers from South Holland
UEFA Women's Euro 2017 players